Szabadbattyán is a village in Fejér county, Hungary. Located about 10 km from Székesfehérvár and about 30 km from Lake Balaton. The area has been inhabited since prehistoric times. Archeological record go back to the Bronze Age. Due to its location it is an important transport hub.

It is famous in Hungary for its confectionery and buildings that range from a cathedral to old fashionable churches.

External links

  in Hungarian
 Street map 

Populated places in Fejér County